Bastøy Lighthouse is a coastal lighthouse in the municipality of Horten in Vestfold og Telemark, Norway. It is located 
on the island of Bastøy in Oslofjorden southeast of Horten. It was established in 1840 and originally consisted of a stone house with a low tower.
It was replaced by an automated light in 1986.

See also

 List of lighthouses in Norway
 Lighthouses in Norway

References

External links
 
 Norsk Fyrhistorisk Forening 

Lighthouses completed in 1840
Lighthouses in Vestfold og Telemark